Didone abbandonata is a 1740 setting by Baldassare Galuppi of the libretto of the same name by Metastasio.

Recording
 Didone - Stefania Grasso 
 Enea - Federica Giansanti 
 Selene - Maria Agresta 
 Araspe - Federica Carnevale
 Jarba - Andrea Carè
 Osmida - Giuseppe Varano
 Conductor Franco Piva
Ed. Bongiovanni

References

Italian-language operas
1766 operas
Operas
Operas by Baldassare Galuppi
Operas based on the Aeneid